Joni Lamb (born July 19, 1960) is a Christian broadcaster and the co-founder, vice-president, and executive producer of the Daystar Television Network. She has been involved with Christian television since the mid-1980s and is known for her work with her husband, Marcus Lamb, with Daystar.

Lamb is a supporter of Donald Trump and uses the Daystar Television Network to promote conservative values. Lamb's media contributions are often controversial with criticisms of those who do not share evangelical views, in statements such as on a panel in 2012 where she said: "“if you live in America and you understand that we are a Christian society then ...you shouldn’t live here.”

Early life
Lamb was born as Joni Trammell on July 19, 1960. Her family lived in Greenville, South Carolina through her formative years. Her family were members of the Tremont Avenue Church of God, where Marcus Lamb ministered as a visiting preacher during a revival. The couple met each other at her home church and were married two years later, in 1982. They traveled for the next few years, visiting churches as evangelists. Then, in 1984, they settled in Montgomery, Alabama where they purchased a full power television station and began teaching the Bible on broadcast television. This continued until 1990, when the couple moved to Dallas and formed another station in the larger Texas market. By 1998, they had raised the funds necessary to start Daystar.

Personal life
Joni and Marcus Lamb had three children: Jonathan, Rachel, and Rebecca.

Marcus Lamb had an extramarital affair, which both partners publicly  acknowledged in 2010. In a statement released by their marriage counselor, Fred Kendall stated "He had one inappropriate period of misbehavior, with one person and it wasn't a man. It wasn't a transvestite. It was with a woman; a Christian woman."

Daystar programming

Joni Table Talk
Lamb hosts her self-titled half-hour program Joni Table Talk (initially titled Joni) each weekday on Daystar. The format of the show is typically a round table discussion with other ministers, singers and celebrities discussing a wide range of topics that combine contemporary cultural issues and the Christian faith. In 2004, the show was awarded as the Best Television Talk Show by the National Religious Broadcasters.

Ministry Now!
Lamb co-hosts the Daystar flagship program Ministry Now! (previously called, Marcus and Joni and initially titled Celebration). The hour-long program is broadcast five days a week on their Daystar network. Joni's children share host duties and discuss news related to the network, ministry, and issues of interest to the Christian faith with daily guest(s). Joni and her daughters sing with the Daystar Singers during the Daystar program.

Controversies

Anti-LGBT views 
According to statements following an extramarital affair by Marcus Lamb and private jet controversy, Joni Lamb holds anti-LGBT views. Lamb stated "thousands" of people "have come out of homosexuality" and "may be the most discriminated people in the world today." She has also claimed homosexuality is "ungodly" and "God cannot bless you and you cannot fulfill your destiny while you are operating within the realm of homosexuality."

Anti-vaccination and voter fraud conspiracies 
Lamb also uses family platforms and shows to promote conservative values and unfounded claims related to vaccination and voter fraud in the 2020 presidential election. "The Lamb family have used their platforms to advertise prayer events in conjunction with the Trump family as well as to promote anti-vaccination organizations. In November, Daystar encouraged its members to sign a petition urging the Supreme Court to either recount or overturn the presidential election results and institute a re-vote."

References

External links
 Daystar Network - Joni Lamb Bio
 Daystar Network - "Joni" with Joni Lamb

1960 births
People from Colleyville, Texas
Living people
American television evangelists
Pentecostals from Texas
People from Greenville, South Carolina
American women television personalities
Television personalities from Texas